Charnocks is a town located in the province of Christ Church, Barbados. Charnocks is known for its sugar plantation.

References 

Populated places in Barbados